Dancer of Death is a 1920 German silent film directed by Siegfried Philippi and starring Reinhold Schünzel and Hans Adalbert Schlettow.

The film's sets were designed by the art director Edmund Heuberger.

Cast
 Hans Adalbert Schlettow
 Reinhold Schünzel
 Emmy Wyda
 Herbert Kiper
 Rudolf Klein-Rhoden
 Hanna Lierke
 Lissi Lind
 Viktor Senger
 Hans von Zedlitz
 Johanna Zimmermann

References

Bibliography
 Bock, Hans-Michael & Bergfelder, Tim. The Concise CineGraph. Encyclopedia of German Cinema. Berghahn Books, 2009.

External links

1920 films
Films of the Weimar Republic
German silent feature films
Films directed by Siegfried Philippi
German black-and-white films
1920s German films